This is a list of colonial heads of Cuba.

Dates in italics indicate de facto continuation of office.

For continuation after independence see List of presidents of Cuba.

See also

 List of governors of Provincia de Santiago de Cuba
Timeline of Cuban history

References

Further reading
 

 
 
Cuba